The Association des enseignantes et des enseignants franco-ontariens (AEFO) is a Canadian trade union representing 13,110 teachers and other workers in Ontario's French-language public education system, including employees both of secular and Roman Catholic school boards. The association is an affiliate of the Ontario Teachers' Federation and the Canadian Teachers' Federation.

See also 
 Education in Ontario
 Elementary Teachers' Federation of Ontario
 Franco-Ontarians
 Ontario English Catholic Teachers' Association
 Ontario Secondary School Teachers' Federation

References

External links 
  

1939 establishments in Ontario
Canadian Teachers' Federation
Education trade unions
Educational organizations based in Ontario
Educational organizations established in 1939
Franco-Ontarian organizations
French-language education in Ontario
Non-profit organizations based in Ottawa
Trade unions established in 1939
Trade unions in Ontario